Minehead is a coastal town and civil parish in Somerset, England. The parish of Minehead has a population of approximately 11,981, making it the most populous town in the western part of the Somerset West and Taunton local government district, which in turn, is the worst area in the country for social mobility. This figure includes Alcombe and Woodcombe, suburban villages which have been subsumed into Minehead.

There is evidence of human occupation in the area since the Bronze and Iron Ages. Before the Norman conquest, it was held by Ælfgar, Earl of Mercia and after it by William de Moyon and his descendants, who administered the area from Dunster Castle, which was later sold to Sir George Luttrell and his family. There was a small port at Minehead by 1380, which grew into a major trading centre during the medieval period. Most trade transferred to larger ports during the 20th century, but pleasure steamers did call at the port. Major rebuilding took place in the Lower or Middle town area following a fire in 1791 and the fortunes of the town revived with the growth in sea bathing, and by 1851 was becoming a retirement centre. There was a marked increase in building during the early years of the 20th century, which resulted in the wide main shopping avenue and adjacent roads with Edwardian-style architecture. The town's flood defences were improved after a storm in 1990 caused flooding.

Minehead is governed by a town council, which was created in 1983. In addition to the parish church of St. Michael on the Hill in Minehead, the separate parish church of St Michael the Archangel is situated in Church Street, Alcombe. Alcombe is also home to the Spiritualist Church in Grove Place. Since 1991, Minehead has been twinned with Saint-Berthevin, a small town close to the regional centre of Laval in the Mayenne département of France. Blenheim Gardens, which is Minehead's largest park, was opened in 1925. The town is also the home of a Butlins Holiday Park which increases Minehead's seasonal tourist population by several thousand.

There is a variety of schools and religious, cultural and sporting facilities including sailing and wind surfing and golf. One popular ancient local tradition involves the Hobby Horse which takes to the streets for four days on the eve of the first of May each year, with accompanying musicians and rival horses. The town is the starting point of the South West Coast Path National Trail, the nation's longest long-distance countryside walking trail. The Minehead Railway was opened in 1874 and closed in 1971 but has since been reopened as the West Somerset Railway.

History
The town sits at the foot of a steeply rising outcrop of Exmoor known as North Hill, and the original name of the town was mynydd, which means mountain in Welsh. It has also been written as Mynheafdon (1046), Maneheve (1086), Menehewed (1225) and Menedun (also 1225), which contain elements of Welsh and Old English words for hill.

Bronze Age barrows at Selworthy Beacon and an Iron Age enclosure at Furzebury Brake, west of the town show evidence of prehistoric occupation of the area, although there is also possible evidence in the intertidal area, where the remains of a submerged forest still exist.

Minehead was part of the hundred of Carhampton. It is mentioned as a manor belonging to William de Moyon in the Domesday Book in 1086, although it had previously been held by Ælfgar, Earl of Mercia. William de Mohun of Dunster, 1st Earl of Somerset and his descendants administered the area from Dunster Castle, which was later sold to Sir George Luttrell and his family.

There was a small port at Minehead by 1380, but it was not until 1420 that money given by Lady Margaret Luttrell enabled improvements to be made and a jetty built. During the reign of Elizabeth I, the town had its own Port Officer similar to the position at Bristol. Vessels in the 15th century included the Trinite which traded between Ireland and Bristol, and others carrying salt and other cargo from La Rochelle in France. Other products included local wool and cloth which were traded for coal from South Wales. In 1559 a Charter of Incorporation, established a free Borough and Parliamentary representation, but was made conditional on improvements being made to the port. The harbour silted up and fell into disrepair so that in 1604 James I withdrew the town's charter. Control reverted to the Luttrells and a new harbour was built, at a cost of £5,000, further out to sea than the original, which had been at the mouth of the Bratton Stream. It incorporated a pier, dating from 1616, and was built to replace that at Dunster which was silting up. Trade was primarily with Wales for cattle, sheep, wool, butter, fish and coal. These are commemorated in the town arms which include a woolpack and sailing ship. Privateers based at Minehead were involved in the war with Spain and France during 1625–1630 and again during the War of the Spanish Succession from 1702–1713. The first cranes were installed after further improvements to the port in 1714.

By the beginning of the 18th century, trade between Minehead and Ireland, South Wales, Bristol and Bridgwater grew, with forty vessels based in the harbour for trade and herring fishing. It was also a departure point for pilgrims to Santiago de Compostela. Until the 19th century, trade continued with Ireland but Minehead vessels started to travel further afield to Virginia and the West Indies. Further problems with the port continued and led to a decline in trade and the fisheries in the late 18th century and in 1834 the port lost its jurisdiction to Bridgwater. In the 20th century most trade transferred to larger ports, but pleasure steamers did call at the port. Minehead Lifeboat Station was established in 1901 near the harbour. The pier was demolished during the Second World War as it obstructed the view from the gun battery set up on the quay head, as part of the coastal defence preparations, which stopped steamers calling at the harbour until it was cleared in 1951. In 1808 a ship, believed to be the Bristol Packet which had been built in 1801, was wrecked on Madbrain Sands.

Major rebuilding took place in the Lower or Middle town area following a fire in 1791. In that year a Carrara marble statue of Queen Anne, sculpted by Francis Bird was presented to the town by Sir Jacob Bancks, who served as the local Member of Parliament from 1698 to 1715. It originally stood in the parish church but was moved to Wellington Square in 1893, when the marble pedestal and canopy by H. Dare Bryan were added. Lower town and the quay area were rebuilt and the fortunes of the town revived with the growth in sea bathing, and by 1851 was becoming a retirement centre.

Early areas of development of the town include Higher Town with its cottages, many of which are "listed" buildings of historic interest, some of which are still thatched, and the Quay area. In Victorian times wealthy industrialists built large houses on North Hill and hotels were developed so that tourism became an important industry.  It was in the Victorian and Edwardian era that tourism in the town increased. There was a marked increase in building in the early years of the 20th century when the landowners, the Luttrells of Dunster Castle, released extensive building land. Probably the most prolific Edwardian architect was W.J.Tamlyn from North Devon who settled in the town and was responsible for designing several hundred domestic properties as well as Minehead Town Hall and the Queen's Hall.

The steamship SS Pelican grounded in Minehead Bay on 22 June 1928, on an unmarked reef known as the Gables that circles Minehead Bay,  from land. The Pelican was sailing from Port Talbot to Highbridge. The crew of five were rescued by the Minehead Lifeboat. Evacuees were billeted in Minehead during the Second World War. During the war, the town was bombed by KG 54, a Luftwaffe bomber wing on the night of the 7/8 April 1941. Butlins opened in 1962, and has brought thousands of visitors to the town.

Governance
The civil parish of Minehead is governed by a town council, which was created in 1983. In 2002, the parish was estimated to have a population of 10,330. Administratively, Minehead is part of the non-metropolitan district of Somerset West and Taunton, which was established on 1 April 2019. It was previously in the district of West Somerset since 1974, and part of Minehead Urban District before that. The district is in turn part of the Somerset shire county, and administrative tasks are shared between county, district and town councils.

It falls within the Bridgwater and West Somerset constituency represented in the House of Commons of the Parliament of the United Kingdom. It elects one Member of Parliament (MP) by the first-past-the-post system of election. The current MP is Ian Liddell-Grainger, a member of the Conservative Party.

Geography

Minehead is located on the Bristol Channel coast of South West England, and thus experiences one of the highest tidal ranges in the world.

The town is overlooked by North Hill, and is just outside the boundaries of Exmoor National Park. The cliff exposures around the shoreline are dramatic and fossils are exposed. Areas of the town included Higher Town, Quay Town and Lower or Middle Town, although they are no longer separate.

In 1990, much of Minehead's beach was washed away in a severe storm which also caused serious flooding in the town. A £12.6 million sea defence scheme by the Environment Agency was designed to reduce the risk of this erosion and flooding happening in the future. The Environment Agency built  of new sea wall and rock or concrete stepped revetments between 1997 and 1998 and imported 320,000 tons of additional sand in 1999 to build a new beach. This beach sits between four rock groynes and has been built at a much higher level than the previous beach so that the waves are broken before they reach the new sea wall. Any waves that do reach the new wall are turned back by its curved shape. The town's new sea defences were officially opened in 2001.

Blenheim Gardens, which is Minehead's largest park, was opened in 1925. The bandstand within the park is used to host musical events.

Along with the rest of South West England, Minehead has a temperate climate which is generally wetter and milder than the rest of England. In general, December is the dullest month and June the sunniest. The south west of England enjoys a favoured location, particularly in summer, when the Azores High extends its influence north-eastwards towards the UK.

Cloud often forms inland, especially near hills, and reduces exposure to sunshine. The average annual sunshine totals around 1,600 hours. Rainfall tends to be associated with Atlantic depressions or with convection. In summer, convection caused by solar surface heating sometimes forms shower clouds and a large proportion of the annual precipitation falls from showers and thunderstorms at this time of year. About 8–15 days of snowfall is typical. November to March have the highest mean wind speeds, with June to August having the lightest. The predominant wind direction is from the south-west.

Landmarks

The town's major tourist attraction is Butlins holiday camp. Others include: the terminus of the West Somerset Railway; the town's main ornamental park, Blenheim Gardens, off Blenheim Road; and the Minehead & West Somerset Golf Club, Somerset's oldest golf club, established in 1882, which has an 18-hole links course. A variety of sailing and wind surfing options are on offer, as well as the usual beach activities. There are many other attractions and amusement arcades, for example "Merlins" and a variety of well-known high street stores such as WHSmith and Boots, together with independent local shops. The town has both a Tesco and a Morrisons supermarket on its outskirts as well as a new Lidl.

The South West Coast Path National Trail starts at a marker, erected in Minehead in 2001, partly paid for by the South West Coast Path Association. The UK's longest long-distance countryside walking trail, it runs along the South West Coast to Poole in Dorset.

Transport
The town's location—sea to the north and Exmoor to the south—means that transport links are limited.

Local bus services are operated by  First West of England and Quantock Motor Services.

Minehead railway station is close to the beach. It was operated by the Bristol and Exeter Railway which was amalgamated into the Great Western Railway in 1876. The Minehead Railway was itself absorbed into the GWR in 1897, which in turn was nationalised into British Railways in 1948. It was closed on 4 January 1971 but has since been reopened as the West Somerset Railway, which is notable for being the longest standard-gauge heritage railway in Britain.

Education
In Minehead, there are two first schools, one middle school (Minehead Middle School) and an upper school, West Somerset College, which provides education for 1,298 students between the ages of 13 and 18. In 2006 there was debate about changing West Somerset's 3-tier school system to a 2-tier system to match the rest of Somerset and the majority of education authorities in the UK.

Religious sites

The Anglican parish church of St Michael dates from the 15th century and has been designated by English Heritage as a Grade II* listed building; its tower used to display a beacon light for ships approaching the harbour. After being caught in a violent storm at sea, Robert Quirke dedicated a ship and its cargo to God's service, as well as donating a cellar near the quay for prayers to be offered for those at sea. Dating from 1628 and known as the Gibraltar Celler , it is now the Chapel of St Peter. Quirke also donated money from the sale of the ship and its cargo to build almshouses.

St Michael's parish church contains a number of historical highlights, including an impressive late medieval rood screen and rood stair, and an attractive stained glass window designed by Sir Henry Holiday. The view from the churchyard of the surrounding hills and coastline is breathtaking.

The Church of St Michael the Archangel in Alcombe was built in 1903 as a chapel of ease for the Dunster parish, but in 1953 it became the Parish Church of Alcombe in its own right. St Andrew's Church, on Wellington Square in the town, was built of red sandstone in 1877–1880, by George Edmund Street.

Butlins Minehead is the only Butlins resort still to have a small on-site chapel, and over the Easter period the resort hosts an annual Spring Harvest, the largest Christian festival in the UK. There are also religious sites serving the needs of the Baptist, Evangelical, Methodist and United Reformed communities and the Plymouth Brethren. Alcombe is also home to the Spiritualist Church in Grove Place.

Local economy
Minehead has one of the UK's three remaining Butlins holiday camps, and tourism has been a part of Minehead's economy since Victorian times. At the height of the season in late July and early August, the town's population is significantly increased by tourists.

There is a Farmers' Market in the Parade every Friday from 8:30 am to 2 pm, selling local produce.

Culture
The town hosts the annual Minehead and Exmoor Festival, a week-long classical music festival that has been running since 1963. Richard Dickins has held the post of artistic director for the festival since 1982.

The wooded bluffs above Minehead feature as the Hermit's abode "in that wood which slopes down to the sea", in The Rime of the Ancient Mariner by Romantic poet Samuel Taylor Coleridge. The poet lived nearby, at Nether Stowey (between Bridgwater and Minehead). His statue can be seen at the nearby harbour at Watchet. He and Wordsworth (who lived nearby at Alfoxton House) would often roam the hills and coast on long night walks; leading to local gossip that they were 'spies' for the French. The Government sent an agent to investigate, but found they were, indeed, "mere poets". Cecil Frances Alexander wrote the popular Anglican hymn All Things Bright And Beautiful in Minehead and in nearby Dunster the verse:

"The purple headed mountain,
The river running by,
The sunset and the morning,
That brightens up the sky;−" Refers to Grabbist Hill and the River Avill that runs near it through the popular tourist location Snowdrop Valley on Exmoor

Minehead was the setting of Monty Python's 1970 "Mr. Hilter" sketch, in which Adolf Hitler (posing as a "Mr. Hilter"), Joachim von Ribbentrop ("Ron Vibbentrop") and Heinrich Himmler ("Heimlich Bimmler") conspire at a local rooming house to win the local by-election as the "National Bocialist" candidate and unite Minehead with neighbouring Taunton (in the style of the Anschluss in 1938).

May Day Hobby Horse

One popular ancient local tradition involves the Hobby Horse, or Obby Oss, which takes to the streets on the eve of the first of May each year, with accompanying musicians and rival horses, for four days. In fact there are three rival hobby horses, the Original Sailor's Horse, the Traditional Sailor's Horse and the Town Horse. They appear on May Eve (called "Show Night"), on May Day morning (when they salute the sunrise at a crossroads on the outskirts of town), 2 and 3 May (when a ceremony called "The Bootie" takes place in the evening called "Bootie Night" at part of town called Cher). Each horse is made of a boat-shaped wooden frame, pointed and built up at each end, which is carried on the dancer's shoulders.

As at Padstow, his face is hidden by a mask attached to a tall, pointed hat. The top surface of the horse is covered with ribbons and strips of fabric. A long fabric skirt, painted with rows of multicoloured roundels, hangs down to the ground all round. A long tail is attached to the back of the frame. Each horse is accompanied by a small group of musicians and attendants. The Town Horse is accompanied by "Gullivers", dressed similarly to the horse but without the large frame; as at Padstow, smaller, children's horses have sometimes been constructed. The horses' visits are (or were) believed to bring good luck. In the past there was also a similar hobby horse based at the nearby village of Dunster, which would sometimes visit Minehead. The first of May has been a festival day in Minehead since 1465.

Sport and recreation
Minehead Barbarians, the town's rugby club, have been playing together since the 1930s, but the main local football club, Minehead A.F.C., is even older, founded in 1889. In September 2007, the TWIF European Outdoor Tug of war Championships was held at the football club's stadium. Minehead Cricket Club, based at the West Somerset College in Alcombe, field four men's teams and one women's team while Minehead Hockey Club plays close by at the West Somerset Sports & Leisure Centre. There were plans for a swimming pool to be built in the grounds of the West Somerset College and there is a bowls club on Irnham Road.

Minehead has on several occasions been the location of 'Britain's Strongest Man' contest, most recently in 2004, and since 2006 the Butlin's Resort has been one of the venues for the World Wrestling Entertainment's UK winter tour. In 2010 stage four of the Tour of Britain road cycling race started in Minehead.

In April 2010 RadioMinehead.com started to broadcast music, travel news, events guide and general to and for the Minehead community.

The 2011 European Outdoor Tug of War Championships was held within the grounds at Butlin's Minehead from 22 to 25 September.

Since December 2012 Minehead has hosted the PDC Players Championship Finals.

Minehead also hosts many motorsport events including the Somerset Stages Rally which has been hosted in the area for years. There is also the Enduroland Quad and Motocross Event held in Bratton Woods.

Arcade amusements

Arcade

The Arkade
Tekken 3 (1999–2001)
The House Of The Dead (1997–1999)  
Time Crisis II (1998–2020) 
Rapid River (1999) 
The Lost World: Jurassic Park (1997–2020) 
The House of the Dead 2 (1999–2017)

Notable residents
Richard Chorley (1927–2002), noted physical geographer, was born and brought up in Minehead.
Arthur C. Clarke (1917–2008), science fiction writer, was born in Minehead.
Edward Ellicott (1768–1847), naval officer during the French Revolutionary Wars and Napoleonic Wars, lived in Alcombe with his family and died there.
Peter Hurford (1930–2019), organist and composer, was born in Minehead.
 Tim Kevan writer, blogger and barrister, author of the Baby Barista series of books, was brought up in Minehead.
Stephen Mulhern (born 1977), television presenter, was born in Minehead, although he also claims he was born in Stratford, East London.
Adam O'Brian (born 1989), actor in The Imposter, was brought up in Minehead.
Sir Nick Partridge (born 1955), Chief Executive of The Terrence Higgins Trust, and a key campaigner on HIV and AIDS, lived in the town in the 1970s when his family moved there to run a hotel.
 Danielle Waterman (born 1985), member of the England women's national rugby union team and member of the 2014 Women's Rugby World Cup-winning team, was brought up in Minehead.

References

External links

 Minehead Town Council (official site)
 
 The Minehead Meander
 
 

 
Exmoor
Ports and harbours of Somerset
Seaside resorts in England
Towns in West Somerset
Civil parishes in Somerset
Populated coastal places in Somerset
Beaches of Somerset